edIT (born Edward Ma) is an American electronic music producer and DJ based in Los Angeles, California. He is a member of The Glitch Mob.

History
After growing up in Boston, Edward Ma began his career as a DJ and got into music production while he was studying at the University of Southern California. From there, he built his name in the Los Angeles underground and began his career in the late 1990s as The Con Artist. He was a resident DJ at Konkrete Jungle in Los Angeles and he hosted a Dublab radio show. He has produced tracks for underground hip hop artists such as Sole and Busdriver. He has also worked with P.E.A.C.E. and Myka 9 of Freestyle Fellowship, Daddy Kev, Hive, Dntel, Emanon and Phoenix Orion.

He is an old friend of Aloe Blacc and Daedelus and has contributed a remix of "Dumbfound" to Daedelus' single "Something Bells" in 2004.

His debut solo album, Crying Over Pros for No Reason, was released on Planet Mu in 2004.

Following the release of his debut, Ma continued to work at the fringes of hip hop and electronic music. In 2006, he co-founded The Glitch Mob with band members Josh Mayer (Ooah) and Justin Boreta (Boreta).

His second solo album, Certified Air Raid Material, was released on Alpha Pup Records in 2007. It features guest appearances from Abstract Rude, The Grouch, TTC, Busdriver and D-Styles.

Ten years after his debut solo album release, Crying Over Pros for No Reason (2004), edIT released Crying Over Pros For No Reason (Deluxe Edition) through The Glitch Mob's Glass Air Records imprint on December 9, 2014. The anniversary re-issue included five new tracks and was released in digital and vinyl formats.
His works are also featuring in Season 2 of the TV series, Shadowhunters.

Although he has stated in 2015 that there will be no more solo projects as edIT, in 2020 he said will release a new solo album as edIT called "Come to Grips"

Discography

Albums
 Crying Over Pros for No Reason (2004)
 Certified Air Raid Material (2007)
 Crying Over Pros for No Reason (Deluxe Edition) (2014)
 Come To Grips (2021)

Singles
 "Battling Go-Go Yubari in Downtown L.A." b/w "Crunk De Gaulle" (2007)
 "The Game Is Not Over" b/w "More Lazers" (2008)

Productions
 Sole - "Uck rt" from Uck rt (2001)
 Busdriver - "Somethingness" from Temporary Forever (2002)
 Acid Reign - "Acid Hip-Hop" from Time & Change (2008)
 Travis Barker - "Cool Head" from Give The Drummer Some (2011)

References

External links
 
 edIT on Alpha Pup Records
 edIT on Discogs

American musicians of Asian descent
American electronic musicians
Intelligent dance musicians
Living people
Musicians from Los Angeles
USC Thornton School of Music alumni
Year of birth missing (living people)
American musicians of Chinese descent
Planet Mu artists